Weathersfield Bow is an unincorporated community in the town of Weathersfield, Windsor County, Vermont, United States. It is located in the southeastern corner of Weathersfield, along the Connecticut River. To the south lies the town of Springfield, and to the north is the village of Ascutney.

Notable people
William Wade Dudley, soldier in the Civil War, lawyer, government official and Republican campaigner
William Jarvis, consul to Portugal under president Thomas Jefferson

Unincorporated communities in Vermont
Vermont populated places on the Connecticut River
Unincorporated communities in Windsor County, Vermont